Ethel Maud Tawse Jollie (8 March 1874 – 21 September 1950; née Cookson; widowed Colquhoun) was a writer and political activist in Southern Rhodesia who was the first female parliamentarian in the British overseas empire.

Career
Cookson was born Ethel Maude Cookson in Castle Church, Stafford, the daughter of Samuel Cookson, a doctor. She studied art under Anthony Ludovici at the Slade School of Fine Art where she met her first husband, explorer Archibald Ross Colquhoun. They married at St. Paul's church, Stafford, on 8 March 1900, and she accompanied her husband on tours across Asia, the Pacific, and Africa, before settling in Southern Rhodesia. After Colquhoun's death on 18 December 1914, she replaced him as editor of United Empire magazine. She later remarried a Rhodesian farmer called John Tawse Jollie.

Tawse Jollie was one of the front figures in the campaign for Rhodesian self-rule, founding the Responsible Government Association in 1917. She was a leading member of the National Service League, the Imperial Maritime League, the British Women's Emigration Society, the Women's Unionist Association, and the Southern Rhodesian Legislative Council. Ethel Tawse Jollie was an avowed anti-suffragist and anti-feminist. She died in Salisbury, Southern Rhodesia, on 21 September 1950.

Works
Two on their Travels, ⁣ William Heinemann, 1902.
The Whirlpool of Europe, with Archibald R. Colquhoun, Dodd, Mead & Company, 1907.
The Vocation of Woman, Macmillan & Co., Ltd., 1913.
Our Just Cause; Facts about the War for Ready Reference, William Heinemann, 1914.
The Real Rhodesia, Hutchinson & Co., 1924.
Native Administration in Southern Rhodesia, Royal Society of Arts, 1935

Articles
” On Some Overseas Poetry," United Empire, Vol. I, 1909/1910.
"The Husband of Madame de Boigne," The Nineteenth Century, Vol. LXVII, January/June 1910.
"Feminism and Education," The University Magazine, Vol. XII, 1913.
"Woman and Morality," The Nineteenth Century, Vol. LXXV, January 1914.
"The Superfluous Woman: Her Cause and Cure," The Living Age, Vol. LXIII, April/June 1914.
"Archibald Colquhoun: A Memoir," United Empire, Vol. VI, 1915/1916.
"As Others See Us," United Empire, Vol. VI, 1915/1916.
"The Balkan States and the War," United Empire, Vol. VI, 1915/1916.
"Some Humours of Housekeeping in Rhodesia," Blackwood's Magazine, Vol. CC, July/December 1916.
"Modern Feminism and Sex Antagonism," The Lotus Magazine, Vol. 9, No. 2, November 1917; Part II, Vol. 9, No. 3, December 1917.
"Woman-Power and the Empire," United Empire, Vol. VIII, 1917/1918.
"Germany and Africa," United Empire, Vol. IX, 1918/1919.
"Rhodesia and the Union," United Empire, Vol. X, 1919/1920.
"The Question of Southern Rhodesia," United Empire, Vol. XI, 1920.
"The Future of Rhodesia," United Empire, Vol. XII, 1921.
"Britain's New Colony," United Empire, Vol. XIV, 1923.

References

Bibliography

Further reading
Berlyn, Phillippa (1966). "On Ethel Tawse Jollie," Rhodesiana, No. 15.
Berlyn, Phillippa (1969). "Ahead of Her Time," Illustrated Life Rhodesia, No. 3.
Lowry, Donal, "Making Fresh Britains Across the Seas" in Fletcher, Ian Christopher, ed., (2012). Women's Suffrage in the British Empire: Citizenship, Nation and Race, Routledge.
Lowry, Daniel William (Donal) (1989). The Life and Times of Ethel Tawse Jollie, Rhodes University.
Riedi, Eliza (2002). "Women, Gender, and the Promotion of Empire: The Victoria League, 1901–1914," The Historical Journal, Vol. 45, No. 3.
Sanders, Valerie and Delap, Lucy (2010). Victorian and Edwardian Anti-Feminism, Routledge.

External links
Ethel Tawse Jollie
The Romance of Melsetter

1874 births
1950 deaths
Anti-suffragists
Female critics of feminism
20th-century Zimbabwean women writers
20th-century Zimbabwean writers
Rhodesian politicians
Members of the Legislative Assembly of Southern Rhodesia
British emigrants to Rhodesia
White Rhodesian people
20th-century Zimbabwean women politicians
20th-century Zimbabwean politicians